Penetanguishene Naval Yard was a Royal Navy yard from 1834 to 1856 in Ontario.

Land was first acquired in 1798 near Penetanguishene and a base finally built in 1813, but it was abandoned in 1815 at the end of the War of 1812. It was reinstated in 1816 and remained in naval service until 1834. 

The base served as the headquarters of the Lake Huron fleet of the Provincial Marine until 1834. The navy transferred the base to the army and continued until 1856. The base also served northwestern supply routes and provided general surveillance of the upper Great Lakes.

The navy base and army depot comprise 15 buildings, including:

 officers barracks
 warehouses
 offices
 King's Wharf
 3 storehouses

Vessels built or stationed here:

 Bee - gunboat
 Minos - gunboat
 Mohawk - steamer
 Tecumseh - schooner
 Newash - brigantine
 Mosquito - gunboat
 Wasp - gunboat
 unnamed frigate 1814

The base is now rebuilt as part of the Penetanguishene's Historic Naval and Military Establishment. B. Napier Simpson, Jr. 1925-1978, a restoration architect in Ontario devoted his professional life to raising public awareness of the importance of heritage conservation including the Penetanguishene's Historic Naval and Military Establishment. project, now known as Discovery Harbour.

See also
 Siege of Detroit
 Rush–Bagot Treaty

References

External links
 Canadian Historical Naval Ships and Yards
 The History of Penetanguishene
 Ships from the age of sail
 List of Vessels Employed on British Naval Service on the Great Lakes, 1755-1875

Military history of Canada
Royal Navy bases in Canada
Naval history of Canada
Royal Navy dockyards in Canada
Lake Huron
1813 establishments in Canada
Military installations established in 1813
Military history of the Great Lakes